Zenetti is a surname of Italian origin. Notable people with the surname include:

 Leopold von Zenetti (1805–1892), Austrian composer
 Lothar Zenetti (1926–2019), German Catholic theologian, priest, and author of books and poetry

See also
 Zanetti

Surnames of Italian origin